Alex Hideo Shibutani (born April 25, 1991) is an American ice dancer. Partnered with his sister Maia Shibutani, he is a two-time Olympic bronze medalist (2018), a three-time World medalist (silver in 2016; bronze in 2011 and 2017), the 2016 Four Continents champion, and a two-time U.S. national champion (2016, 2017). The Shibutanis have also won six titles on the Grand Prix series and a silver medal at the 2009 World Junior Championships. They are two-time members of the US Olympic team, competing at the 2014 Winter Olympics in Sochi, Russia, and the 2018 Winter Olympics in Pyeongchang, South Korea. In 2018, they became the first ice dancers who are both of Asian descent to medal at the Olympics (bronze in team figure skating and ice dancing). They are the second sibling duo to ever share an ice dancing Olympic medal, and the first from the United States.

Personal life
Alex Hideo Shibutani was born on April 25, 1991, in Boston. He is the son of Chris and Naomi Shibutani, both of Japanese descent, who met as Harvard musicians. He has a younger sister, Maia Shibutani who competes with him as his partner for ice dancing. He attended the Brunswick School in Greenwich, Connecticut, during the late 1990s before relocating to Colorado Springs from 2005 through 2007 then Ann Arbor, Michigan in 2007.

While in Colorado Springs, Alex Shibutani attended Cheyenne Mountain High School and finished his sophomore year there. He completed his junior and senior years of high school at Huron High School and entered the University of Michigan in the fall semester of 2009.

Career

Early career
Alex Shibutani began skating at age seven. He originally trained as a single skater and competed up to the juvenile level in singles. In March 2003, he and his family attended the World Championships in Washington D.C. He said, "We were seated close to the ice in the second row, and when the ice dancers came out for their warm up, we could actually feel a gust of wind as the skaters flew by. We were so impressed with the artistry, skating quality, and speed of the top teams that we decided to give it a try."

2004–2005 season
Maia and Alex Shibutani teamed up to compete in ice dancing in the spring of 2004. Their singles coach, Kathy Bird, arranged for them to work with their first dancing coaches Andy Stroukoff and Susie Kelley. The Shibutanis also worked with Mary Marchiselli. During their juvenile season, their programs were choreographed by Josh Babb.

During the 2004–2005 season, their first season of competition, they competed on the juvenile level, which is the lowest competitive level in the U.S. Figure Skating testing structure. During that season, Alex Shibutani represented the Hickory Hill Figure Skating Club in competition. They competed at the 2005 North Atlantic Regional Championships, the qualifying competition for the U.S. Junior Championships, and won the competition. The win qualified them for the 2005 U.S. Junior Championships. At that competition, they placed second in the first compulsory dance, fourth in the second compulsory dance, and third in the free dance, ending up with the silver medal.

2005–2006 season
After moving up to the intermediate level and performing well at the non-qualifying competitions, the Shibutanis went to Colorado Springs, Colorado to work with choreographer Tom Dickson. During that off-season, they were being coached by Judy Blumberg on the east coast. After doing better than expected at the Lake Placid Ice Dance Competition in the summer of 2005, the Shibutanis decided to move coaching centers to a better training environment and so moved to train in Colorado Springs under head coach Patti Gottwein. During that time, they also worked with Rich Griffin, Damon Allen and Eric Schulz.

Alex Shibutani changed his club representation to the Broadmoor Skating Club, where he and his sister trained. The Shibutanis won the Southwestern Regional Championships, their qualifying competition for the 2006 U.S Junior Championships. At the 2006 U.S. Junior Championships, they placed second in the first compulsory dance and then won the second compulsory and free dances to win the title overall. They worked as guest bloggers and aides for the media staff for U.S. Figure Skating at the 2006 U.S. Championships, and again at the 2006 Four Continents, which were held in Colorado Springs.

2006–2007 season
The Shibutanis moved up to the novice level, which is the first and lowest of three levels that compete at the U.S. Championships. At the 2007 Midwestern Sectional Championships, their qualifying competition for the national championships, the Shibutanis competed under the ISU Judging System for the first time. They placed second in the first compulsory dance and then won the second compulsory and the free dances to win the competition overall and qualify for the 2007 U.S. Championships. At Nationals, the Shibutanis placed second in both compulsory dances and then won the free dance to win the novice gold medal by a margin of victory of 2.06 points ahead of silver medalists Sara Bailey & Kyle Herring. This was their second consecutive national title.

Following the 2007 U.S. Championships, the Shibutanis changed coaches to Igor Shpilband and Marina Zueva in Canton, Michigan. One factor in the decision to change coaches was the issue of university for Alex Shibutani, who at the time of the coaching change, had two years left of high school and was considering his university options.

2007–2008 season

The Shibutanis moved up to the junior level nationally. However, they were unable to compete internationally on the junior level because Maia was not yet old enough. At the 2008 Midwestern Sectionals, the Shibutanis placed fourth in the compulsory dance and then third in the original and free dances to win the bronze medal overall. This medal qualified them for the 2008 U.S. Championships. At Nationals, they placed 7th in the compulsory dance, 2nd in the original dance, and 4th in the free dance. They placed 4th overall, winning the pewter medal.

2008–2009 season: Silver at World Junior Championships

Maia Shibutani became age-eligible to compete on the international junior circuit. The siblings made their junior international debut on the ISU Junior Grand Prix (JGP). At their first event, the 2008–09 ISU Junior Grand Prix event in Courchevel, France, they placed second in the compulsory dance and then won the original and free dances to win the gold medal overall by a margin of victory of 11.00 points over silver medalists Kharis Ralph and Asher Hill. They were then assigned to their second event, the event in Madrid, Spain. At this event, they placed second in all three segments of the competition and won the silver medal. These two medals qualified them for the  2008–2009 ISU Junior Grand Prix Final, for which they were the third-ranked qualifiers. Qualifying for the event had also qualified them for the 2009 U.S. Championships.

The Junior Grand Prix Final was held concurrently with the senior final for the first time and so did not have a compulsory dance segment. The Shibutanis placed 7th in the original dance and 3rd in the free dance, finishing in 4th place overall.

The Shibutanis went on to the 2009 U.S. Championships, where they competed on the junior level for the second consecutive year. At the event, the Shibutanis placed second in the compulsory dance, the original dance, and the free dance. They won the silver medal overall marking their fifth consecutive podium finish at a national-level competition. Following the competition, the Shibutanis were named to the team to the 2009 World Junior Championships.

At Junior Worlds, the Shibutanis placed 5th in the compulsory dance, 4th in the original dance, and 2nd in the free dance. At the ages of 14 and 17, they won the silver medal.

2009–2010 season
The Shibutanis won both of their JGP events and won the bronze medal at the JGP Final. They again skated at the junior level at US Nationals, which they won. At 2010 Junior Worlds, they finished off the podium in fourth place. This was their final junior event.

2010–2011 season: World bronze medal

The Shibutanis moved to the senior level. They finished fifth at the 2010 Nebelhorn Trophy, moving up from eighth after the short dance with a strong free dance showing. They won the bronze medal at both the 2010 NHK Trophy and the 2010 Skate America, making them the first dance team to medal at both Grand Prix events in its first senior season. They were the first alternates for the Grand Prix final.

The Shibutanis finished second at U.S. Nationals and were chosen to compete at the Four Continents and World Championships. They won the silver medal at Four Continents. At the World Championships, they were in fourth after the short dance, 4.09 points behind third-placed Nathalie Péchalat / Fabian Bourzat. In the free dance, they scored 4.34 ahead of Pechalat and Bourzat, both of whom had fallen. The Shibutanis finished third overall by 0.25 points and won a bronze in their World Championships debut, a feat not even Tessa Virtue and Scott Moir, the current Olympic Champions, had accomplished.

2011–2012 season

The Shibutanis started their season with a silver medal at the 2011 Finlandia Trophy. Beginning their Grand Prix season, they won silver at the 2011 Cup of China. A week later they placed first at the 2011 NHK Trophy, edging Kaitlyn Weaver and Andrew Poje for gold by 0.09 points. It was the Shibutanis' first senior Grand Prix title. Their combined results qualified them for the Grand Prix Final.

The Shibutanis finished 4th at the 2012 Four Continents and 8th at the 2012 World Championships.

Invited by Secretary of State Hillary Clinton, the Shibutanis attended a dinner in honor of Japanese Prime Minister Yoshihiko Noda on May 1, 2012, in Washington, D.C.

Following Igor Shpilband's dismissal from the Arctic Edge Arena in June 2012, the Shibutanis decided to remain at the rink with Marina Zoueva and ended their collaboration with Shpilband.

2012–2013 season
The Shibutanis placed third in the short dance at the 2012 Rostelecom Cup. They paused their free dance for half a minute due to Alex pulling a muscle in his thigh. They were allowed to continue from the point of interruption and finished 4th overall behind Russian ice dancers Victoria Sinitsina and Ruslan Zhiganshin. They won the bronze medal at their next event, the 2012 NHK Trophy. The Shibutanis also took bronze at the 2013 U.S. Championships. They then competed at the 2013 Four Continents and finished 4th behind Madison Chock and Evan Bates. At the 2013 World Championships, the Shibutanis finished 8th.

2013–2014 season
The Shibutanis began their season by winning bronze medals at 2013 Skate America and 2013 NHK Trophy. They then went on to win the bronze medal at the 2014 U.S. Championships and were named in the U.S. team to the 2014 Winter Olympics in Sochi, Russia. They placed 9th at the Olympics. The Shibutanis also competed at the 2014 World Championships, where they placed 6th.

2014–2015 season
The Shibutanis started their season by winning the gold medal at the 2014 Ondrej Nepela Trophy. They then won the silver medal at the 2014 Skate America. At the 2014 Ice Challenge, the Shibutanis won the gold medal. They then went on to compete at their second Grand Prix event, 2014 Cup of China, where they won the silver medal. Their results on the Grand Prix series qualified them for the 2014–15 Grand Prix Final, where they placed 4th.

At the 2015 U.S. Championships, the duo won the silver medal behind Madison Chock and Evan Bates. They then went on to compete at the 2015 Four Continents Championships and the 2015 World Championships where they placed 3rd and 5th, respectively.

2015–2016 season: Return to World podium

The Shibutanis began their season by winning the bronze medal at 2015 Ondrej Nepela Trophy. On the Grand Prix circuit, they earned standing ovations for Fix You, their Coldplay free dance. They won the silver medal at 2015 Skate Canada International and the gold medal at the 2015 NHK Trophy, for their second career Grand Prix event title.

They qualified for the 2015–16 Grand Prix Final as the fourth ranked team based on qualification criteria that had been modified in an attempt to account for the partially cancelled Trophee Bompard event. Their combined short dance and free dance score from NHK Trophy of 174.43 points was the highest total score amongst all competitors during the Grand Prix season. At the Grand Prix Final event, they placed 4th in the short dance. The night before the free dance, Alex became severely ill with food poisoning. They chose to compete nonetheless, and managed to get another standing ovation for their free dance. They finished 4th in the free dance and 4th overall. They withdrew from the exhibition so that Alex could recover.

At the 2016 U.S. Championships, the Shibutanis placed second behind Madison Chock and Evan Bates during the short dance, but moved up following the free dance to win their first senior US title. They earned standing ovations from the audience at both segments of the competition.

The Shibutanis next competed at the 2016 Four Continents Championships. They set personal bests and finished first in both segments of the competition for their first ISU Championship title.

The Shibutanis ended their season at the 2016 World Figure Skating Championships. There, they set new personal bests and finished second in both segments of the competition for their second world medal.

2016–2017 season
At the 2017 U.S. Championships, the Shibutanis won their second national title; they edged out Chock/Bates by 1.01 points after placing first in the short dance and second in the free dance. The siblings took silver at the 2017 Four Continents in Gangneung (South Korea), having ranked second in both segments to Canada's Virtue/Moir.

At the 2017 World Championships in Helsinki (Finland), they ranked fifth in the short dance and fourth in the free dance, ending up third overall by a margin of 0.37 over Canada's Weaver/Poje. The siblings received their third world medal, bronze.

2017–2018 season
The Shibutanis made their season debut at the 2017 Rostelecom Cup. They scored 77.30 in the short dance and 111.94 in the free dance to place first in both segments and won the gold medal, with 189.24 points. At their second GP event, 2017 Skate America, they again won both the short and free dance for a total of 194.25 and first place overall, qualifying for the Grand Prix Final in Nagoya. At the Grand Prix Final, they earned a second consecutive bronze medal.

At the 2018 U.S. Figure Skating Championships, the Shibutanis placed first in the short dance and third in the free dance, placing them second overall behind Madison Hubbell and Zachary Donohue. They returned to the Winter Olympics in 2018, favorites for a medal in the ice dance event. They performed both the short and free dance in the team figure skating event, helping Team USA win the bronze medal. The Shibutanis later beat fellow Americans Madison Hubbell and Zachary Donohue for the bronze medal in ice dancing. Maia and Alex received a short dance score of 77.73, a free dance score of 114.86, and a total score of 192.59. They were the only Americans to medal in their individual event.

Programs

Post-2018

Pre-2018

Competitive highlights

GP: Grand Prix; CS: Challenger Series; JGP: Junior Grand Prix

(with Maia Shibutani)

Senior results

Junior results

Detailed results
(with Maia Shibutani)

Senior results

Social media presence and television appearances
Maia and Alex Shibutani are amongst the most active Olympic sports athletes engaged across several social media platforms. Their YouTube channel @ShibSibs, established in 2012, includes 95 videos which have been viewed almost nine million times by over 157,000 subscribers, as of April 2018. Videos consist a range of formats including behind-the-scenes montages from their travels throughout the world for training, exhibition shows and competitions. Amongst the popular are lip synch music videos with casts which include popular Olympic figure skaters and gymnasts from all over the world, including Yuzuru Hanyu and Mao Asada, Michelle Kwan, Kristi Yamaguchi, Brian Boitano, Javier Fernandez, Adam Rippon, Meryl Davis and Charlie White. Videos are created (including filming, editing) entirely by the Shibutanis.

Their respective Instagram and Twitter accounts (@maiashibutani, @alexshibutani) have been tagged as accounts to follow by various media accounts including global media publications such as the New York Times as "Olympian Instagram Accounts to follow".

The Shibutanis were guests on the Nickelodeon television show, Nicky Ricky Dicky & Dawn appearing as themselves during episode 304 broadcast in 2017. They have made several appearances on NBC's The Today Show, including to skate performance on the Rockefeller Center rink and to introduce Ralph Lauren designed outfits for the 2018 US Olympic team.

Philanthropy and diplomacy
 In 2017, the Shibutanis were named Sports Envoys by the U.S. State Department's Sports Diplomacy Office, joining a select roster of figure skaters, including Michelle Kwan and Evan Lysacek, who have been named to this role in the past. As envoys, the siblings have traveled to South Korea (2017) and Japan (2018, 2019).
 Right To Play Athlete Ambassadors since 2013
 LA2028 Athlete Advisory Commission members. Active involvement in the successful bid which brings the 2028 Summer Olympics back to the U.S. The Shibutanis participated in the panel presentation at the US Olympic Media Summit, joining LA2028 Chairman Casey Wasserman and Athletes Relations Liaison Janet Evans.
 Other organizations and causes to which the Shibutanis have lent support through skating performances, fundraising and social media engagement support include: The Jimmy Fund (through Harvard benefit show An Evening with Champions), Charity: Water (where Maia raised over $10,000 as part of her 2017 birthday campaign), One Fund Boston, and NOH8 Campaign.

Awards and honors
 The siblings are two-time winners of the Edi Award from the Professional Skaters Association for outstanding ice dance performance at US Nationals
 The Shibutanis are several times winners of the US Olympic Committee "Team of the Month" award (including in October 2017 and December 2017) for their competitive achievements while representing Team USA internationally.
 Maia and Alex were nominated and elected as Finalists for the 2018 James E. Sullivan Award, awarded annually since 1930 by the AAU honoring the best amateur athlete in America across all sports.

Brand partnerships and sponsors
 Tumi Inc. - brand ambassadors
 Ralph Lauren Corporation - official sponsored athletes along with fellow Olympians Gus Kenworthy, Aja Evans, Jamie Anderson and Paralympian Rico Roman.
 Intel - Global Team Intel Athletes for the 2018 Winter Olympic Games
 Coca-Cola Corporation's Minute Maid brand
 The Hershey Company's Ice Breakers brand
 Smucker's Milk-Bone brand

References

External links

 
 
 Maia Shibutani / Alex Shibutani at IceNetwork.com
 
 
 

American male ice dancers
1991 births
Figure skaters from Boston
Sportspeople from Greenwich, Connecticut
Living people
American sportspeople of Japanese descent
World Figure Skating Championships medalists
Four Continents Figure Skating Championships medalists
World Junior Figure Skating Championships medalists
Figure skaters at the 2014 Winter Olympics
Figure skaters at the 2018 Winter Olympics
Medalists at the 2018 Winter Olympics
Olympic bronze medalists for the United States in figure skating
Brunswick School alumni
University of Michigan alumni
American dancers of Asian descent